Lists of women Twenty20 International cricketers are lists of women's Twenty20 International cricket players by team.

 List of Argentina women Twenty20 International cricketers
 List of Australia women Twenty20 International cricketers
 List of Austria women Twenty20 International cricketers
 List of Bangladesh women Twenty20 International cricketers
 List of Bahrain women Twenty20 International cricketers
 List of Barbados women Twenty20 International cricketers
 List of Belgium women Twenty20 International cricketers
 List of Belize women Twenty20 International cricketers
 List of Bhutan women Twenty20 International cricketers
 List of Botswana women Twenty20 International cricketers
 List of Brazil women Twenty20 International cricketers
 List of Cameroon women Twenty20 International cricketers
 List of Canada women Twenty20 International cricketers
 List of Chile women Twenty20 International cricketers
 List of China women Twenty20 International cricketers
 List of Costa Rica women Twenty20 International cricketers
 List of Denmark women Twenty20 International cricketers
 List of England women Twenty20 International cricketers
 List of Eswatini women Twenty20 International cricketers
 List of Fiji women Twenty20 International cricketers
 List of France women Twenty20 International cricketers
 List of Gambia women Twenty20 International cricketers
 List of Germany women Twenty20 International cricketers
 List of Ghana women Twenty20 International cricketers
 List of Greece women Twenty20 International cricketers
 List of Guernsey women Twenty20 International cricketers
 List of Hong Kong women Twenty20 International cricketers
 List of India women Twenty20 International cricketers
 List of Indonesia women Twenty20 International cricketers
 List of Ireland women Twenty20 International cricketers
 List of Isle of Man women Twenty20 International cricketers
 List of Italy women Twenty20 International cricketers
 List of Japan women Twenty20 International cricketers
 List of Jersey women Twenty20 International cricketers
 List of Kenya women Twenty20 International cricketers
 List of Kuwait women Twenty20 International cricketers
 List of Lesotho women Twenty20 International cricketers
 List of Malawi women Twenty20 International cricketers
 List of Malaysia women Twenty20 International cricketers
 List of Maldives women Twenty20 International cricketers
 List of Mali women Twenty20 International cricketers
 List of Malta women Twenty20 International cricketers
 List of Mexico women Twenty20 International cricketers
 List of Mozambique women Twenty20 International cricketers
 List of Myanmar women Twenty20 International cricketers
 List of Namibia women Twenty20 International cricketers
 List of Nepal women Twenty20 International cricketers
 List of Netherlands women Twenty20 International cricketers
 List of New Zealand women Twenty20 International cricketers
 List of Nigeria women Twenty20 International cricketers
 List of Norway women Twenty20 International cricketers
 List of Oman women Twenty20 International cricketers
 List of Pakistan women Twenty20 International cricketers
 List of Papua New Guinea women Twenty20 International cricketers
 List of Peru women Twenty20 International cricketers
 List of Philippines women Twenty20 International cricketers
 List of Qatar women Twenty20 International cricketers
 List of Romania women Twenty20 International cricketers
 List of Rwanda women Twenty20 International cricketers
 List of Samoa women Twenty20 International cricketers
 List of Saudi Arabia women Twenty20 International cricketers
 List of Scotland women Twenty20 International cricketers
 List of Serbia women Twenty20 International cricketers
 List of Sierra Leone women Twenty20 International cricketers
 List of Singapore women Twenty20 International cricketers
 List of South Africa women Twenty20 International cricketers
 List of South Korea women Twenty20 International cricketers
 List of Spain women Twenty20 International cricketers
 List of Sri Lanka women Twenty20 International cricketers
 List of Sweden women Twenty20 International cricketers
 List of Tanzania women Twenty20 International cricketers
 List of Thailand women Twenty20 International cricketers
 List of Uganda women Twenty20 International cricketers
 List of United Arab Emirates women Twenty20 International cricketers
 List of United States women Twenty20 International cricketers
 List of Vanuatu women Twenty20 International cricketers
 List of West Indies women Twenty20 International cricketers
 List of Zimbabwe women Twenty20 International cricketers

See also
 Lists of women Test cricketers
 Lists of women One Day International cricketers